Adama Damballey (born 1957) is a Gambian wrestler. He competed in the men's freestyle 74 kg at the 1988 Summer Olympics.

References

1957 births
Living people
Gambian male sport wrestlers
Olympic wrestlers of the Gambia
Wrestlers at the 1988 Summer Olympics
Place of birth missing (living people)